Eppeldorf is a village in the commune of Ärenzdallgemeng, in eastern Luxembourg between Bettendorf and Beaufort.
, the village has a population of 176.

Geography 
The village is situated at an altitude of 280 meters.

References 

Diekirch (canton)
Villages in Luxembourg